Memorial Hospital North, also called UCHealth Memorial Hospital North, is an acute hospital in Colorado Springs, Colorado, in El Paso County.

History
The hospital first opened in 2007 as a community hospital. Since then, it has undergone a large expansion, making it a full-service hospital.

The hospital, located on the north side of Colorado Springs, operates in partnership with Memorial Hospital Central, located downtown.

References

External links
Hospital website

Hospitals in Colorado
Buildings and structures in El Paso County, Colorado
Hospitals established in 2007
2007 establishments in Colorado